The Bystrinskoye mine is one of the largest gold mines in Russia and in the world. The mine is located in Zabaykalsky Krai. The mine has estimated reserves of 6.4 million oz of gold.

References 

Gold mines in Russia